Bastanak (English: I'm Waiting for You) is the fifth studio album by Lebanese singer Elissa released by Rotana on 16 February 2006, making it her second album released by Rotana Records. The album sold more than 3.7 million copies by October 2006, and earned Elissa the World Music Award for the best-selling artist in the Middle East and North Africa for the second time in a row. As a result, Routledge named Elissa one of the world's most popular singers in 2006.

The album included twelve songs and a bonus remix track, many of which have been translated into other languages. "Bastanak" was translated into Turkish, and two versions in Hindi were released as well. "Fatet Sineen" was also transferred to Turkish, and an Egyptian cover was voiced by Hamou Beka. "Kermalak" and "Law Taarafou" were translated into Turkish, and "Hikayti Maak" was translated into Bulgarian.

Track listing

Personnel
Adapted from the album liner notes.

 Tony Haddad - mastering
 Edward Meunier - mixing
 Charbel Mounayer - sound engineer
 Alain Owaijan - acoustic guitar (tracks 2, 9, 12)
 Mohamed Saleh - bouzouki (track 5)
 Maurice Tawile - editor, recording (tracks 1, 3, 4, 9) and vocals recording
 Gerome Degey - electric guitar (track 1)
 Dergham Owainati - executive producer
 Gerome Degey - guitar (tracks 3, 5, 6, 7, 10, 11)
 Tony Campbell - guitar (tracks 1, 4)
 Gilbert Yammine - kanun (tracks 6, 12)
 Jihad Assaad - kanun (track 11)
 Ali Madbouh - ney (track 12)
 Raymond Hajj - percussion (tracks 1, 12)
 Mohamed Saleh - percussion (tracks 2, 5, 7)
 Ralph Khoury - percussion (track 5)
 Camille Khoury - percussion (track 11)
 Dany El Helou - piano (track 4)
 Mazin Siblini - piano (track 9)
 Said Imam - production manager
 Charbel Mounayer - recording (track 5, 6, 7, 8, 10, 11)
 Mohamed Kebbe - recording (tracks 2, 9, 12)
 Nidal Abu Samra - saxophone (track 4)
 Hratch Assis - soprano saxophone (track 9)
 Claude Chalhoub - strings (tracks 2, 9, 12)
 Raymond Nassif - strings (tracks 1, 3, 4, 5, 6, 7, 8, 10, 11)
 Ziad Nawfal - translator
 Matthias Clamer - photography
 Bassam Fattouh - make up
 Yehia and Zakaria - hair

References

Elissa (singer) albums
Rotana Records albums
2006 albums